Norra Storfjället is a minor sub-range of the Scandinavian Mountains, located in the county of Västerbotten, in Lapland, Sweden. It is, for the most part, located within Vindelfjällen Nature Reserve. Other peaks include Måskostjakke and Södra Sytertoppen. It is divided approximately in half by a deep valley, the valley of Syterskalet – Viterskalet. This U-shaped valley, similar to Lapporten in northern Lapland, is one of the natural landmarks of the reserve. A ski resort is located at Hemavan in the southwest of the area.

Gallery

References 

Mountain ranges of Sweden
Geography of Västerbotten County